The SNCF Class BB 63400 was a class of centre cab diesel locomotives built for SNCF between 1959 and 1960 by Brissonneau et Lotz. The class consisted of 23 locomotives numbered 63401– 63423. The construction was financed under the Eurofima arrangements. Initially they were based at Nantes for use as yard pilots. In later years they were transferred elsewhere as electrification took over. The class was withdrawn from service by 2015.

A BB 63400 locomotive, BB 63413 Plathee, was used as a hybrid locomotive testing platform from 2009 to 2011.

References

63400
B-B locomotives
BB 63400
Standard gauge locomotives of France

Freight locomotives